The Grosse Pointe Public School System (GPPSS) is a school district headquartered in Grosse Pointe, Michigan in Metro Detroit.

Schools

High schools:
 Grosse Pointe North High School (Grosse Pointe Woods)
 Grosse Pointe South High School (Grosse Pointe Farms)

Middle schools:
 Brownell Middle School (Grosse Pointe Farms)
 Parcells Middle School (Grosse Pointe Woods)
 Pierce Middle School (Grosse Pointe Park)

Elementary schools:
 Defer Elementary School (Grosse Pointe Park)
 Ferry Elementary School (Grosse Pointe Woods, formerly Ferry Middle School)
 Kerby Elementary School (Grosse Pointe Farms)
 Maire Elementary School (Grosse Pointe)
 Stevens T. Mason Elementary School (Grosse Pointe Woods)
 Monteith Elementary School (Grosse Pointe Woods)
 Pere Gabriel Richard Elementary School (Grosse Pointe Farms)

Preschools:
 Barnes Early Childhood Center (Grosse Pointe Woods, formerly Barnes Elementary School)

In June 2019 the school board voted to close Poupard Elementary School and Trombly Elementary School as the numbers of students had declined.

Governance
GPPSS policy is governed by the seven member Board of Education and administered by the Superintendent.

Responsibilities
Recruits, hires and evaluates the performance of the superintendent.
Establishes policy for the district and shares in policy development.
Helps translate the district vision into long and short-term goals. The board establishes the structure to accomplish the vision, and periodically evaluates the results.
Reviews and adopts the budget submitted by the superintendent and aligns the funding priorities with the district goals.
Approves recommended curriculum and texts based on standards, goals and policies established by the board. Review and evaluate curriculum as it relates to student assessment results.
Adopts policies governing salaries and salary schedules, terms and conditions of employment, fringe benefits, leave and professional development and employee evaluations.
Determines school facility needs and communicates proposed construction plans to the community.
Adopts policies governing school-community relations, advocates for the public school system and remains responsive to community ideas and needs.
Evaluates the performance of the board and provides feedback for personal leadership development.

Viral Video
Grosse Pointe Public School is the subject of a video posted by Click On Detroit Local 4, a Detroit TV station, that have since gone viral. The video showed a teacher who had recently resigned giving a speech at board meeting, exasperated at the incompetence of the elected board members, having made terrible decisions in regards to the COVID-19 pandemic situation.

Controversy 
After having the free lunch edict put in place, many of the school were switched to cheaper food suppliers, who in turn supplied lower quality food that was then consumed by a number of students. After a total of three months of the free lunch edict being put into place, a total of 32 students had missed school or failed to report on time due to food poisoning. 

Another incident occurred were a white mother was caught using the n-word several times on a school board meeting, much to the shock of many of the fellow school board members. This was all due to mainly her offspring using the n-word and being suspended.

References

External links

 Grosse Pointe Public School System

Education in Wayne County, Michigan
School districts in Michigan
1921 establishments in Michigan
School districts established in 1921